Just Me is the fifth studio album by Australian singer Tina Arena, released in Australia on 12 November 2001 by Columbia Records. Arena co-wrote tracks on the album with Desmond Child, Robbie Neville, Mark Hudson, Victoria Shaw and Peter-John Vettese. Debuting in the Australian ARIA Albums Chart top ten, Just Me was Arena's third top ten album but the album was considered a commercial failure. Two singles taken from the album; "Soul Mate #9" and "Dare You to Be Happy" were not major hits, while the third single "Symphony of Life" became Arena's fifth top ten hit.

Writing and content
The album was written mainly in Europe and the United States. Arena worked with different collaborators than on her previous albums including Nile Rodgers, Peter-John Vettese, Lukas Burton and Paul Manners, which Arena hoped would strengthen her appeal to both old and new fans. At the time, Arena stated "I set out to make a record that reflected all of the personal, sonic and lyrical growth that I believe I have undergone in recent years. The only master plan, the only objective I set for myself, was to experiment and write the freshest sounding record I could - one that was truly an indication of where I am at in my life right now." She also states "I don't see this album as a continuation of my previous work. I think it is definitely a new beginning - almost a rebirth. That's part of the reason it took a long time to make. I wanted to be sure about what I wanted to say and how I wanted to say it, and I think it was good to gain a little bit of perspective away from a fairly relentless presence in this country."

She also states "People are very curious - which is a really good thing but this is quite a departure, so I hope they like it. Making this record has given me a lot of emotional strength, and has allowed me the opportunity to share some of the things that have played an important part in my personal growth over the past few years. I have laid it all out there for the world to see - and I guess to judge. However overall, it's a very positive and intimate record and I think people will identify with it."

She said, of working with producers/songwriters Rodgers and Vettese; "I have to wait until I get into the studio with the producers for the sounds to really happen. That's when all the magic starts. Nile and Peter were such encouraging producers to work with and they were able to come up with exactly what I was after. I was very excited to be working with Nile, given his incredible pedigree and Peter has to be one of the funniest and most talented men on the planet. It was important to be surrounded by positive people; but at the same time, I didn't want to be around anyone who was hiding anything from me. I think that we achieved the perfect balance." The album also explores a new electronic sound for Arena, which is evident on "Soul Mate #9", "Symphony of Life" and "Woman". She stated "It was fun to bop again, to move again. Bringing all those infectious beats into the mix - the ones that you can't help but dance to - was really important."

Chart performance
The album debuted on the Australian ARIA Albums Chart on 19 November 2001 at number seven and was certified gold by ARIA. The album fell out of the top twenty in its second week and spent only four weeks in the top fifty and twelve weeks in the top one hundred. In France, despite debuting and peaking at number forty-seven, the album spent a total of forty-four weeks in the top one hundred and fifty and was eventually certified gold by the SNEP. The album was less successful in Switzerland, where it debuted at number seventy-four and peaked at number sixty-seven spending just three weeks in the top one hundred.

Track listing

Personnel
Tina Arena – vocals
Richard Bailey – photography
Ian Dench – guitar
John Fortis – bass guitar
Erik Godal – keyboard, programming
Simon Hale – conductor, string arrangements
Richard Hilton – keyboard, shaker, electric sitar, programming, mixing, engineer
Paul Manners – bass, guitar, percussion, vocals, mixing, engineer
Nile Rodgers – guitar, electric sitar
Sylver Logan Sharp – background vocals
Sacha Skarbek – strings, keyboard
Peter-John Vettese – keyboard, background vocals, programming, string arrangements

Charts

Weekly charts

Year-end charts

Certifications

Release history

References

2001 albums
Columbia Records albums
Tina Arena albums
Albums produced by Nile Rodgers
Electropop albums
Disco albums by Australian artists